Leionema phylicifolium, commonly known as alpine phebalium, is a shrub that is endemic to south-eastern Australia. It is a small shrub with green, smooth, leathery leaves and pale yellow flowers in spring.

Description
The smooth calyx lobes are triangular shaped,  and smooth.

Taxonomy
The species was first formally described by Victorian Government Botanist Ferdinand von Mueller who had observed the species "on the highest peaks of the Cobboras Mountains, and on the sources of the Mitta Mitta."  Mueller named it Phebalium phylicifolium and the description was published in Transactions and Proceedings of the Victorian Institute for the Advancement of Science. In 1998 Paul G. Wilson changed the name to Leionema phylicifolium and the name change was published in the journal Nuytsia.

Distribution and habitat
Alpine phebalium is found growing at higher altitudes in eastern Victoria in scrubland, eucalypt woodland and heath, mostly in wetter locations. It also occurs in New South Wales in the extreme south-east of the state in the Kosciuszko National Park and south from the upper Tuross River in dry sclerophyll forest and heath.

References

External links

phylicifolium
Sapindales of Australia
Flora of New South Wales
Flora of Victoria (Australia)
Taxa named by Ferdinand von Mueller